Caloboletus inedulis is a bolete fungus of the family Boletaceae that is native to North America. Until 2014, it was known as Boletus inedulis. Recent changes in the phylogenetic framework of the Boletaceae prompted the transfer of this species, along with several other related boletes, including Caloboletus calopus, to the genus Caloboletus. The species is inedible.

See also
List of North American boletes

References

External links
 

inedulis
Fungi described in 1938
Fungi of North America
Inedible fungi
Taxa named by William Alphonso Murrill